Kinnebrew is a surname. Notable people with the surname include:

 Earl Kinnebrew (1889–1989), American college football player
 Larry Kinnebrew (born 1960), American football player